Dharma Pathini may refer to:

 Dharma Pathini (1986 film), a 1986 Tamil-language Indian film
 Dharmapatni (1987 film), a 1987 Telugu language film
 Dharma Pathini (1941 film), a 1941 Telugu language film